The blackear lizardfish (Synodus hoshinonis) is a species of lizardfish that lives mainly in the Indo-West Pacific Ocean.

References
 

Synodontidae
Fish described in 1917